The Shendi Formation is a Late Cretaceous geologic formation of the Atbara-Shendi Basin in northern Sudan. Indeterminate theropod remains have been recovered from it. As well as those of the dyrosaurid Hyposaurus. It consists of a lower unit of fine grained meandering channel sediments, separated by an erosive contact with overlying meandering to braided river channel sandstones.

The formation overlies Precambrian basement and is overlain by the Hudi Chert.

Paleofauna
Hyposaurus
Theropoda indet.

See also 
 List of dinosaur-bearing rock formations
 List of stratigraphic units with indeterminate dinosaur fossils

References

Bibliography 
 

Geologic formations of Sudan
Upper Cretaceous Series of Africa
Maastrichtian Stage
Sandstone formations
Siltstone formations
Mudstone formations
Fluvial deposits
Fossiliferous stratigraphic units of Africa
Paleontology in Sudan
Formations